Lamar University (Lamar or LU) is a public university in Beaumont, Texas. Lamar has been a member of the Texas State University System since 1995. It was the flagship institution of the former Lamar University System. As of the fall of 2022, the university enrollment was 17,044 students. Lamar University is accredited by the Southern Association of Colleges and Schools and named for Mirabeau B. Lamar, the second president of the Republic of Texas.

The university campus has an urban setting and the core campus of LU is 299+ acres. LU is organized into five undergraduate colleges, one graduate college, and an honors college.

History

Louis R. Pietzsch founded a public junior college in Beaumont's South Park area at the direction of the South Park School District.  Lamar University started on September 17, 1923 as South Park Junior College, operating on the unused third floor of the new South Park High School. Pietzsch acted as the first president of the college. South Park Junior College became the first college in Texas to receive Texas Department of Education approval during the first year of operation, and became fully accredited in 1925.

In 1932, the college administration, recognizing that the junior college was serving the region rather than just the community, renamed it as Lamar College. It was named for Mirabeau B. Lamar, the second president of the Republic of Texas, who arranged to set aside land in counties for public schools. A statue of him was installed in the quadrangle of the campus near the Setzer Student Center. In 1933, the college was moving toward independence from South Park High School when construction began on new facilities. By 1942, the college was completely independent of the South Park school district, and operations moved to the current campus.

With the end of World War II, an influx of veterans boosted enrollment. The Lamar board of trustees asked the Texas Legislature to promote Lamar College to a four-year state college. The initial attempt in 1947, led in the Texas House of Representatives by Jack Brooks and in the Texas Senate by W. R. Cousins Jr., failed, but the following year the two sponsors again advanced the bill through both houses. On June 14, 1949, Governor Beauford Jester signed the bill creating Lamar State College of Technology.

Enrollment continued to grow throughout the 1950s and 1960s, reaching 10,000 students. Graduate work was authorized in 1960, when master's degrees were offered in several fields. In 1969, Lamar State College opened its first branch at a center in Orange, Texas. In 1970, Lamar State College began offering its first doctoral program, the Doctor of Engineering. In 1971 the college's name was officially changed to Lamar University.

A group of African American veterans of World War II, barred from admission on the grounds of race and calling themselves the Negro Goodwill Council, protested to Governor Beauford Jester about the exclusion of blacks from Lamar State College. They attempted to block passage of the bill to change Lamar into a state-supported senior college, which resulted in John Gray, Lamar's president, creating a black branch of Lamar called Jefferson Junior College. It opened with evening classes at Charlton-Pollard High School. In 1952, James Briscoe, a graduate of Charlton-Pollard High School, applied to Lamar. His parents were laborers and members of the Beaumont chapter of the NAACP. The admissions office notified him that on the basis of his transcript, he was qualified to enroll for the spring term of 1951. On January 29, when Briscoe went to register for classes, Lamar's acting president G. A. Wimberly explained that a mistake had been made and suggested he apply to TSUN, now named Texas Southern University. State law, he said, created Lamar for whites only. In the summer of 1955, Versie Jackson and Henry Cooper Jr. became the lead plaintiffs of a class action lawsuit, Jackson v. McDonald, which sought to end Lamar's policy of racial segregation. Lamar Cecil, federal judge, ruled on July 30, 1956, that Lamar's “white youth” only admissions policy was unconstitutional, and that September, a total of twenty-six black students were admitted to the college amid violent protests at the campus gates and throughout the region which continued for a number of weeks until Texas Rangers arrived and the rule of law was restored.

In 1975, the university merged with Port Arthur College in Port Arthur, Texas, creating Lamar University-Port Arthur. In 1983, state Senator Carl A. Parker sponsored a bill creating the Lamar University System. In 1986, Lamar University-Orange and Lamar University-Port Arthur were granted accreditation separate from the main campus. Lamar Institute of Technology was created in 1990 in Beaumont to provide technical, business, health, and industrial education through programs two years or fewer in length.

In 1995, the Lamar University System was incorporated into the Texas State University System. In the fall of 1998, the Lamar University faculty numbered 423 and student enrollment was 8,241. Total enrollment reached 15,000 students in Fall 2012. In the late 1990s, Lamar began undertaking campus improvement projects.

In 2001, the university began replacing its 1960s-vintage residence halls with new apartment-style housing facilities, dubbed "Cardinal Village."

In March 2005, the gym underwent extensive renovation and adjacent to it, a new recreational sports center was built. The $19 million center, named the Sheila Umphrey Recreational Sports Center, opened in April 2007.

In August 2007, the university completed construction on Cardinal Village IV, a $16-million expansion of its residence halls. The University completed construction of Cardinal Village Phase V in August 2010 bringing on-campus housing capacity to 2,500 students.

The university, in anticipation of the return of football program in 2010, renovated and upgraded Provost Umphrey Stadium (formerly Cardinal Stadium) and a new state-of-the-art Dauphin Athletic Complex. In October 2014, Lamar broke ground for an administration building to be named the Wayne A. Reaud Building. The building houses the newly established Reaud Honors College.  Another recent project included renovation of the Setzer Student Center.  The renovation project had a $28,000,000 cost.  The renovated building was opened on April 12, 2018.

Academics

Lamar offers 96 undergraduate, 50 master's and eight doctoral degree programs in seven academic colleges.  The academic colleges are the College of Engineering, College of Education and Human Development, College of Business, College of Fine Arts and Communication, the College of Arts and Sciences, the College of Graduate Studies, and the Reaud Honors College. Lamar is classified as a Doctoral Research University by the Carnegie Classification of Institutions of Higher Education and is one of only two universities classified as such within the Texas State University System. Lamar and Kunming University of Science and Technology in southwest China have an exchange program that allows Chinese students to attend Lamar for one year while pursuing their bachelor's degree.

The university also has many academic units that fall outside of the five main colleges. The College of Graduate Studies handles graduate students. The Center for Teaching and Learning Enhancement offers training and support to faculty and runs the university's Active and Collaborative Engagement for Students (ACES) Program. The ACES program is designed to provide support to high risk students and integrate active learning methods into all core courses at LU. The university also provides secondary education through the Texas Academy for Leadership in the Humanities, stateu.com and the Texas Governor's School.

In the summer of 2009, Lamar University partnered with the University of Texas at Arlington to create an online dual credit program for high school students in Texas, stateu.com. The partnership between the two universities operates at the website stateu.com. Online dual credit courses are available for free to high school students through state funding via House Bill 3646.

The BAAS online degree completion program, an expansion of a degree the university has offered for almost 20 years, is offered online through Lamar University Academic Partnerships.

Recognition, awards and ranking 
Lamar was ranked in Tier Two of "National Universities" by the U.S. News & World Report's 2015 ranking. According to the site, 76.6% of students who applied to Lamar in 2013 were admitted.  Lamar is ranked in several 2015 U.S. News & World Report categories.
 Best Nursing Schools – 181 (tied)
 Best Speech-Language Pathology – 220
 Best Online Bachelors Programs – 47 (tied)
 Best Online Graduate Justice Programs – 31 (tied)
 Best Online Graduate Education Programs – 35 (tied)
 Best Online Graduate Nursing Programs – 74 (tied)

Lamar was ranked #602 in Forbes 2014 America's Top Colleges report.

College of Engineering

The College of Engineering has 10 research centers under its authority. These are coordinated under the Texas Centers for Technology Incubation (TCTI). The college also participates in the Texas Space Grant Consortium, which sponsors research on space based technologies.

College of Business
The University established the College of Business in 1972. Prior to this time, degrees in business and economics were granted by the Division of Business, which was established in 1951, and the School of Business, established in 1954. All undergraduate and graduate degree programs of the College of Business are accredited by AACSB International.

College of Education and Human Development
The College of Education and Human Development comprises five departments: Educational Leadership, Nutrition, Hospitality & Human Services, Health & Kinesiology, Counseling and Teacher Education.

The undergraduate teacher preparation program and the graduate state certification programs in School Counseling and the Principal Program are accredited by the Association for Advancing Quality in Educator Preparation (AAQEP).

Lamar is among the largest educator preparation programs of teachers in the nation due to its large Masters in Education programs.

College of Arts and Sciences

The College of Arts and Sciences' fields of study include Physics, Mathematics, Computer Science, Biology, Chemistry, Nursing, Music, English, Earth Science, Foreign Language, History, Political Science, Criminal Justice and Psychology. The College is home to the JoAnne Gay Dishman School of Nursing.

College of Fine Arts and Communication

The College of Fine Arts and Communication consists of six departments: Art & Design, Communication & Media, Deaf Studies and Deaf Education, Music, Speech and Hearing Sciences, and Theatre & Dance. Communication degree programs include journalism, broadcasting, film, American Sign Language and interpretation, speech-language pathology, and audiology. Lamar University is one of five universities in Texas which offer a clinical doctorate in audiology program. The Department of Communication & Media operates LUTV, a local educational access television station, and KVLU (FM 91.3) a National Public Radio station. Fine arts degree programs include studio art, graphic design, art education, music performance, music education, acting, technical theatre, and dance. The Department of Art's faculty includes internationally acclaimed artists Keith Carter and Prince Varughese Thomas.

Reaud Honors College

The Reaud Honors College, established in the fall of 2014, became the ninth honors college in the state of Texas.  The honors program has been part of the university's academic offering since 1963.  The 45,000 sq ft Wayne A. Reaud Building, which houses the honors college as well as university administration offices, broke ground on October 7, 2014.  The honors college is a member of the National Collegiate Honors Council and the Great Plains Honor Council.

Campus
The Lamar University campus is located off of Martin Luther King Boulevard, near U.S. Highway 69, in the southeast part of Beaumont, Texas. The Big Thicket National Preserve, Village Creek State Park, and the Gulf of Mexico are all located within 30 minutes of the school. Facilities include the 10,080 seat Montagne Center, the eight-story Mary and John Gray Library and the 16,000 seat Provost Umphrey Stadium.

Cardinal Village

Cardinal Village is the university's community of apartment-style dormitories, part of Lamar University's investment in student life on campus. As of 2010, there were five "Phases" of Cardinal Village with the capacity to house 2500 students. Each room includes a private bedroom, furnished with the necessities of college life such as a mini-refrigerator, microwave, computer desk, telephone outlets, cable TV access, and easy connectivity to the University's network.  Cardinal Village housing also offers community centers, study areas, meeting rooms, fitness centers, a swimming pool, on-site laundry facilities, basketball and volleyball courts, social lounges, and parking. During the summer of 2011 all five phases of Cardinal village were renamed for previously-demolished residence halls on campus: Phase I – Gentry Hall, Phase II – Morris Hall, Phase III – Combs Hall, Phase IV – Campbell Hall and Phase V – Monroe Hall.

Mary and John Gray Library

The tallest structure on campus at eight stories, the Mary and John Gray Library serves as a landmark for the university. Named after Mary and John Gray, considered to be the “first couple” of the university, the red brick structure took two and a half years to complete. The library holds extensive physical and digital collections, including 395,003 physical books, 99,548 e-books, and 142 digital databases, and provides access to current journal content from 48,851 journals. The library provides its users with a variety of digital tools, such as the online catalog and EBSCO EDS, an integrated search discovery system that allows single searches across multiple databases. Faculty and students can gain access to materials not held by our library through a robust interlibrary loan service and document delivery, in which we purchase journal articles on demand at no cost to the user. A service-oriented staff provides face-to-face, phone, and chat research assistance, as well as extensive subject guides and self-paced online tutorials to assist all Lamar users in using library resources to best advantage.

On November 22, 2021, the university announced Texas Legislature approval of $44.9 million in capital construction assistance toward expansion and improvements to the library.  The planning phase for the three year project began in 2022.

Sheila Umphrey Recreational Sports Center

The Sheila Umphrey Recreational Sports Center was completed in 2007 at a cost of $19 million. The construction included renovation of the McDonald Gym, which had previously served as the university's sports center and home of the volleyball program. The naming of the center was made possible by a $5 million donation by local attorney Walter Umphrey in 2005. The  center includes a  cardiovascular room, a one-tenth-mile walking/jogging track, a  climbing wall, basketball, indoor floor hockey/soccer arena, volleyball, badminton courts, and racquetball courts. The center also sports a wellness and fitness center, health food café and juice bar. The lounge areas include pool tables, putting green, air hockey, foosball, video games and large screen TV. The center is home to the Recreational Sports Office, which organizes and hosts intramural sports leagues and sport clubs teams such as volleyball, basketball, flag football, cricket, badminton, indoor soccer, pool, ultimate frisbee, and tennis. The tennis club made back-to-back appearances at the national tournament as they won 'Club of the Year' for 2015 and 2016.

Brooks-Shivers Dining Hall

The University's Brooks-Shivers Dining Hall was completed in 2006 for $6.2 million and is named for Southeast Texas congressman Jack Brooks and former Texas governor Allan Shivers.  The  hall is set on a food court-style floor plan that offers a variety of seating areas from barstools to booths. Dining options range from a salad bar, grill and central bakery to pizza, stir fry, Mexican food, pasta, deli and soup stations. The facility has interiors which include artwork created by Lamar University art students and faculty.  On-campus food services are provided by external company Chartwells, which, in addition to the dining hall, provides options including franchised fast food chains and coffee shops.

Setzer Student Center

The Setzer Student Center, known colloquially "The SET", hosts social and cultural activities throughout the year and is the hub for campus student organizations. The lounge areas, Mirabeau's Café and the Cardinal's Nest eatery provide students with a place to socialize and relax. The Setzer Center also houses the bookstore, which stocks textbooks, school supplies, and Lamar University/Lamar Cardinals merchandise. Administrative divisions located in the Set include the Center for Teaching and Learning Enhancement and the Office of Planning and Assessment.

During the Spring 2012 semester, the Student Government Association, led by then-president Andrew Greenberg, passed a student-wide referendum to finance renovation and remodeling the Setzer Student Center.  The vote was passed with 81% approval.  The $28 million project was completed in 2018 with reopening of the center on April 12, 2018.

Dishman Art Museum

The Dishman Art Museum serves as a teaching facility and art museum for Lamar. It was established in 1983. The museum offers students an opportunity to experience diverse styles that reflect international trends, as well as a chance to exhibit their own work. Admission is free. The museum's permanent collection includes 19th- and 20th-century paintings from American and European artists, as well as tribal art from Africa, New Guinea, and Pre-Columbian Mexico.

Spindletop-Gladys City Museum

The Spindletop-Gladys City Museum is an open-air museum. The museum commemorates the 1901 discovery of oil by the Lucas Gusher in Beaumont. The oil discovery was located on Spindletop salt dome in South Beaumont. The boomtown that sprung up around the well was known as Gladys City. 100,000 barrels of oil were soon produced per day, making it the most productive in the world at that time. This productivity sparked an oil boom in Texas that continues to this day.

Athletics

Lamar competes in the Southland Conference in NCAA Division I athletics for all of its varsity sports and at the NCAA Division I (FCS) subdivision level in football. Lamar has participated in practically every level of collegiate athletics from its inception as a junior college in 1923 to its gaining university status in 1971. The men's and women's teams are named the Cardinals and Lady Cardinals, respectively.  The "Lamar Cardinals" (or "Cards") refers to the collegiate athletic teams of Lamar University. The inception of the nickname "Cardinals" dates back to the school's name change to Lamar in 1932.

Lamar fields teams in 17 sports sponsored by the Southland Conference.  LU sponsors 17 teams (8 men's and 9 women's). The Cardinals participate in men's and women's basketball, men's and women's golf, men's and women's indoor and outdoor track and field, men's and women's cross country, men's and women's tennis, women's soccer, softball, and women's volleyball, and baseball and football.  The newest teams are the reinstated football team beginning in 2010, and women's softball which began play in the 2013 season. Note: Separate championships are held for indoor and outdoor track.  A founding member of the Southland Conference, LU has competed in the conference in several stints ranging from 1963-1987, 1998-2021, and then again beginning in 2022 following a single year in the WAC.

Football

Under former head coach Larry Kennan, hist first team complied a 6-3-2 record in 1979. LU set all-time attendance records under Kennan by averaging 16,380 fans in 1980. Games against Louisiana Tech (17,600) and Langston University (17,306) rank second and third, respectively, behind the standing-room-only 18,500 Baylor drew for the 1980 opener. The football program's signature win came on September 5, 1981 in Waco with an 18–17 victory over the No. 20 (UPI) ranked Baylor Bears. In 1987 LU football went independent to join the American South Conference, and the program was dropped altogether in 1989.

On January 30, 2008, 78% of LU students voted to approve the athletics fee required for football's resurrection. This vote set in motion the football team's return for the 2010 season. Regents of The Texas State University System approved the athletics fee to reinstate football at its regular meeting February 20, 2008. On May 19, 2008, Ray Woodard was chosen as head coach for the football program. Aided by a major gift from an anonymous donor, the football field now bears the name W.S. “Bud” Leonard Field, named for a former player and longtime Lamar advocate and regent.

The Lamar University Cardinals football team returned after 21-years on September 4, 2010. The first-year squad compiled a 5–6 record. The Cardinals opened Southland Conference play in 2011. The return of football to Lamar University was in part due to a major donation from Beaumont-based law firm Provost Umphrey. To help renovate the stadium, Walter Umphrey and his wife Sheila also made a personal donation. The stadium is now named Provost Umphrey Stadium.

In December 2016, Mike Schultz was named the program's second head coach since its return. After recording just one winning record in its first nine seasons since being brought back, Schultz guided the Cardinals to a 7–5 record and a third-place finish in the Southland Conference in just his second season. After a 1–4 start to the year, LU closed the regular season by rattling off six-straight wins to earn the program's first berth in the NCAA FCS Playoffs where it faced Northern Iowa.

Basketball

Founded in 1924, the men's and women's basketball teams at Lamar have both advanced deep into the NCAA tournament. The men's team has participated in four NIT tournaments, six NCAA tournaments including four second round appearances and one sweet 16 appearance. The women's team has participated in four WNIT tournaments, two NCAA tournaments including  one Elite Eight appearance.

The men's program has been coached by fifteen head coaches including Billy Tubbs, Pat Foster, Pat Knight, Tic Price, and Alvin Brooks, the current head coach. The women's team has been coached by thirteen head coaches including Larry Tidwell, Robin Harmony and current head coach, Aqua Franklin.

Over the years, both the men's and women's programs have had the highest average attendance in the Southland Conference - both play in the 10,080-seat Montagne Center.

Baseball

The Lamar Cardinals baseball team represents Lamar University and competes in the Southland Conference at the NCAA Division I level. Current head coach Will Davis was hired from LSU in January 2016 to replace legendary coach Jim Gilligan. A former player, Gilligan guided the program for all but five seasons (1987–91) from 1973 through 2016. The LU Hall of Honor and Texas Baseball Hall of Fame member won more than 1,300 games during his career. The Cardinals baseball teams lead the Southland Conference with 10 regular season titles and has participated in the NCAA Division I Regionals 13 times.

Softball

Student life

Student demographics
In fall 2021, Lamar enrolled over 17,000 students. The student body was 36% male and 64% female. Ethnically, 47% identified as White, 25% Black/African-American, 18% Hispanic or Latino, 4% Asian, 3% International, and 2% Other.

Student media

University Press

The University Press, also known as the UP, is the student newspaper of Lamar. The paper was previously known as the S'Park Plug and the Red Bird before becoming the University Press in recognition of Lamar gaining university status in 1971.

KVLU

91.3 FM KVLU public radio is an NPR affiliate station broadcasting throughout southeast Texas. It is licensed to Lamar University with studios located on campus and a transmitter site located in Rose City. Launched in 1974, the station operates independently and features a diverse 24/7 schedule of programs including NPR news morning, midday and afternoon as well as locally produced music programs, local features and radio documentaries, etc. As part of the University's College of Fine Arts and Communication and the Lamar University Media Alliance, KVLU also serves as a real world laboratory, providing training in audio broadcasting and radio production for students interested in pursuing careers in communication. The station is largely member supported with additional support coming from the University and the Corporation for Public Broadcasting as well as program underwriters.

LUTV
LUTV News is the weekly newscast produced by students in the Department of Communication at Lamar University. Broadcast journalism students are required to pitch, shoot, write and edit news content for each week's 30-minute program. Production is led by student producers, directors and crew members, which gives students practical news production experience. LUTV News is broadcast via Spectrum Cable on LUTV-7 in Beaumont, Texas.

LUTV Channel 7

Airing on Time Warner Digital Cable channels 0007 and 6.7, LUTV is the official channel of Lamar University and is owned and operated by the Department of Communication and Media. Ch. 7 airs a wide array of programming such as student/faculty films and artworks, promotional videos, distinguished lectures and events, sports games, talk shows, student produced newscasts, public domain films, and documentaries.

LUMA
The Lamar University Media Alliance (LUMA), consisting of KVLU public radio (91.3 FM); LUTV Productions and LUTV 7 Cablecasting provides outreach programming to serve the general public and hands-on instructional opportunities for students.

Greeks
Lamar boasts 19 national fraternities and sororities. College Panhellenic Council (CPC) is the governing body for the three National Pan-Hellenic Council chapters at LU. National Pan-Hellenic Council (NPHC) governs the nine historically African American fraternities and sororities.  The Inter-Fraternity Council (IFC) governs men's fraternities. The Multicultural Greek Council (MGC) governs three multicultural Greek-letter organizations, two sororities and one fraternity.

Fraternities
 Alpha Phi Alpha
 Sigma Phi Delta
 Alpha Tau Omega
 Pi Kappa Alpha
 Sigma Nu
 Phi Beta Sigma
 Kappa Alpha Psi
 Kappa Alpha Order
 Omega Psi Phi

Sororities
 Alpha Delta Pi
 Zeta Tau Alpha
 Kappa Delta Chi
 Alpha Kappa Alpha
 Alpha Chi Omega
 Delta Sigma Theta
 Zeta Phi Beta
 Sigma Gamma Rho
 Sigma Sigma Rho

Music Greeks
 Phi Mu Alpha Sinfonia
 Kappa Kappa Psi
 Tau Beta Sigma

Other organizations
 Kappa Upsilon Chi
 Alpha Kappa Psi
 Alpha Omega Epsilon

Notable people

Alumni

The university has an alumni base numbering over 75,000. Lamar has the highest median starting and mid-career salary of the four universities in the Texas State University System.

Several Cardinals have gone on to distinguish themselves nationally and internationally in sports, such as PGA Tour golfer Chris Stroud, MLB player Kevin Millar, and college coaches such as Billy Tubbs and Jim Gilligan.

Brian Babin, Jack Brooks, Nick Lampson and Elvin Santos have gone on to be national politicians.

 John Alexander – painter
 Kelly Asbury – film director, screenwriter, voice actor, children's book author and illustrator, non-fiction author
 Bruce Aven – retired Major League Baseball player
 Brian Babin - current member of the U.S. House of Representatives from Texas's 36th congressional district from 2015–present
 Brian Birdwell (B.S., criminal justice, 1984) – member of the Texas State Senate and survivor of the Pentagon attack of September 11, 2001
 Ronnie Black – PGA Tour professional golfer
 Jack Brooks – former Congressman, served more than 40 years in the U.S. House of Representatives
 Keith Carter – photographer
 Trevor Dodds – Namibian professional golfer
 Johnny Fuller – former defensive back, San Francisco 49ers
 Jim Gilligan – one of the NCAA's most winning baseball coaches
James Gulley (born 1965) - former professional basketball player for Ironi Ramat Gan in the Israeli Basketball Premier League
 Midde Hamrin – Olympian marathon runner
 Marvin Hayes – artist
 Clay Hensley – pitcher, Houston Astros
 Clarence Kea – NBA player
 Nick Lampson – former Congressman; served in the U.S. House of Representatives from two Texas districts
 Bill Macatee – TV sports announcer
 Bob McDill – singer/songwriter
 Kevin Millar – MLB World Champion, Boston Red Sox
 Wayne Moore – retired NFL player
 Claude H. Nash – CEO of Bloodstone Ventures; researcher
 Robert Nichols – Texas politician
 Bum Phillips – former head coach and general manager of the Houston Oilers
 Colin Ridgeway – Australian Olympian; former NFL player; first Australian to play in the NFL
 Brian Sanches – pitcher, Philadelphia Phillies
 Elvin Santos – former Vice President of Honduras
 Eugene Seale – former NFL player
 Chris Stroud – PGA Tour professional golfer
 Lynn Sweat – artist and illustrator of Amelia Bedelia children's books
 Billy Tubbs – former college basketball coach
 Jerry Wilkerson – artist
 Ray Woodard – head football coach, NFL player  
 Jen Wyatt – Canadian LPGA golfer
Anthony Iapoce – Former Major League Baseball Player. Current Hitting coach for the Chicago Cubs

People associated with Lamar
 Steve Molyneux – UK educational leader and Microsoft Professor of Global Educational Leadership
 Al Vincent – Major League Baseball coach

References

External links

 
 Lamar Athletics website

 
Educational institutions established in 1923
Education in Beaumont, Texas
Buildings and structures in Beaumont, Texas
Public universities and colleges in Texas
1923 establishments in Texas